Kerik may refer to:
 Bernard Kerik, former police commissioner of New York City
 Kerik, North Khorasan, a village in Iran

See also
 Karik (disambiguation)